The Poet Laureate of Nevada is the poet laureate for the U.S. state of Nevada.

List of Poets Laureate 
 Luther B. Scherer, appointed in 1950. 
 Mildred Breedlove, appointed July 15, 1957
 Norman Kaye, 1967–April 2007
 Gailmarie Pahmeier September 2021 through August 2023

Poet Laureate Emeritus 
 Norman Kaye, April 2007–September 2012

See also

 Poets laureate of U.S. states

Notes

External links
 http://www.lahontanvalleynews.com/article/20041108/Opinion/111080006
 http://articles.chicagotribune.com/2004-11-26/news/0411260247_1_poet-laureate-mary-kaye-trio-poem
 http://www.unr.edu/nwhp/bios/women/breedlov.htm
 http://www.lasvegassun.com/news/2004/nov/02/new-poet-laureate-sought-for-nevada/

 
Nevada culture
American Poets Laureate